Kord Khvord-e Sofla (also Romanized as Kord Khvord-e Soflá and Kard Khowrd Soflá; also known as Kard Khūrd, Kard Khvord, Kord Khord Sofla, Kord Khūrd-e Pā’īn, and Kord Khvord-e Pā’īn) is a village in Bayat Rural District, Nowbaran District, Saveh County, Markazi Province, Iran. At the 2006 census, its population was 78, in 19 families.

References 

Populated places in Saveh County